The Dingles is a 1988 Canadian animated family short film directed by Les Drew.

Summary
Based on a book by Helen Levchuk about a caring, grandmotherly lady and her three cats whose iydlic lives were interrupted by a big windstorm.

See also
The Cat Came Back - the 1988 Oscar-nominated NFB film similar in content.

References

External links
 
 
 
 NFB

1988 animated films
Animated films about cats
National Film Board of Canada animated short films
1988 films
1980s Canadian films